Rio Sports Club is a former first-class cricket team in Sri Lanka. 

Rio competed in the Sri Lankan first-class competition in 1992-93 and 2001-02. They played 14 matches and lost all of them.

They continue to compete at sub-first-class levels.

See also
 List of Sri Lankan cricket teams

References

External links
 Rio Sports Club at CricketArchive

Former senior cricket clubs of Sri Lanka